David Usher (born April 24, 1966) is a British-born Canadian musician, best-selling author, keynote speaker, and activist best known as the front man for the band Moist. He has also released a number of solo albums. He is the founder of Reimagine AI, an artificial intelligence creative studio.

Early life
David Usher was born in Oxford, England to Thai Buddhist artist Samphan Usher and Queen's University economics professor Dan Usher. He has lived in various places such as Malaysia, New York City, California and Thailand since early childhood, before his family settled in Kingston, Ontario. He attended high school at Kingston Collegiate and Vocational Institute at the same time that Gord Downie of The Tragically Hip and Hugh Dillon of the Headstones attended the school. Usher attended Queen's University for one semester before transferring to Simon Fraser University in Burnaby, British Columbia, majoring in political science.

Career
While studying in Vancouver, Usher helped form the band Moist, composed of Usher on vocals, Mark Makoway on guitars, Jeff Pearce on bass, Kevin Young, who, like Usher, had moved to Vancouver from Kingston, on keyboards, and Paul Wilcox on drums. Usher became the principal songwriter for the band.

Moist's debut album Silver was released in 1994 and went on to achieve four-time platinum status, selling 400,000 copies in Canada. Their sophomore album, titled Creature, was released in 1996 and also reached multi-platinum status, selling over 300,000 copies.

In 1998, Usher took a year to work on his own recordings. He released his first solo album, Little Songs. Most of the album was recorded in the kitchen of David's apartment. The album contains a track titled "Baby Skin Tattoo", which bears no relation to the song of the same name on the Moist album Creature.

In 1999, Moist released their third album, titled Mercedes 5 and Dime, once again achieving multi-platinum status. They followed this with a compilation album and DVD in 2001, titled Machine Punch Through: The Singles Collection, and thereafter entered a hiatus period that would last 12 years.

Usher continued with his solo career, releasing his second solo album, Morning Orbit, which sold 90,000 copies. The song "Alone in the Universe" was released as the first single, and the album featured collaborations with some members of Moist and with several figures of the Canadian music scene including Jagori Tanna and Bruce Gordon of I Mother Earth, Gord Sinclair of The Tragically Hip, and the rapper Snow. The album also included a cover of the Tracy Chapman song "Fast Car". A Thai version of the record was released, and included Usher singing in Thai on two of the tracks.

Usher's third solo album, Hallucinations, came out in 2003, and includes a cover of the Manic Street Preachers song "If You Tolerate This Your Children Will Be Next".

Hallucinations was followed by If God Had Curves, which includes collaborations with Tegan Quin of Tegan and Sara, and Bruce Cockburn.

Usher continued to release solo albums throughout the first decade of the 2000s, with Strange Birds (2007) and Wake Up and Say Goodbye (2008). Strange Birds contains themes inspired by New York City, where Usher had moved with his family. It also includes extensive collaborations with other members of Moist. Wake Up and Say Goodbye includes a bonus track featuring Quebec-based singer Marie-Mai, and the album was nominated for a Juno award.

In the early 2010s, David Usher released two more solo albums before reforming the band Moist. The Mile End Sessions came out in 2010, and Songs from the Last Day on Earth in 2012. The Mile End Sessions is composed mostly of previously released songs re-recorded in acoustic arrangements, is produced by Moist member Jonathan Gallivan, contains Usher's first French-language recording, and features contributions from Marie-Mai and Cœur de pirate. Songs from the Last Day on Earth is also produced by Jonathan Gallivan.

In 2013, Moist returned from a 12-year hiatus and recorded their fourth studio album, Glory Under Dangerous Skies, the following year.

In 2016, Usher released his ninth solo studio album, titled Let It Play. The album features English translations of French-Canadian songs, re-recorded originals from Usher's repertoire, as well as high-profile collaborations with artists such as Marie-Mai, Alex Nevsky, Monogrenade, Karim Ouellet, Dumas, Ingrid St-Pierre, Caracol, Daniel Lavoie, Dominique A, and Baden Baden.

Throughout his musical career, Usher has sold more than 1.4 million albums, won four Juno awards, and had several #1 singles singing in English, French, and Thai.

Usher is also the founder of Reimagine AI, an artificial intelligence creative studio based out of Montreal. Reimagine AI integrates interactive and AI technology to build virtual beings.

Usher is the co-creator (with Dr. Damon Matthews) of the Climate Clock. Climateclock.net 

In 2012 Usher made a presentation about the creative process at the Mesh Marketing conference in Toronto. In 2015 he published a book on creativity and the creative process, titled Let the Elephants Run • Unlock Your Creativity and Change Everything.

Personal life
He is featured in the 2001 MuchMusic special Musicians in the WarZone, a humanitarian documentary directed by filmmaker Liz Marshall, in which he journeys to the northern border of Thailand to visit a large Burmese refugee community.

As of 2018, he lives in Montreal, Quebec, with his family.

Discography

Studio albums

Extended plays

Singles

Albums with Moist

Other appearances
 "Watching the Wheels" (John Lennon cover) (Instant Karma: The Amnesty International Campaign to Save Darfur, 2007)

DVDs
 walk.don't.run (Maple Music, 2005)

Videography
 Appears in Building a Mystery from Sarah McLachlan's Surfacing (1997)
 Forestfire from Little Songs (1998)
 Jesus Was My Girl from Little Songs (1998)
 St. Lawrence River from Little Songs (1998)
 Alone in the Universe from Morning Orbit (2001)
 Black Black Heart V 1.0-2.0 from Morning Orbit (2001)
 A Day in the Life from Morning Orbit (2002)
 My Way Out from Morning Orbit (2002)
 Time of Our Lives from Hallucinations (2003)
 Surfacing from Hallucinations (2003)
 Love Will Save The Day from If God Had Curves (May 2005)
 The Music from Strange Birds (2007)
 Ugly is Beautiful from Strange Birds (July 2007)
 Kill the Lights from Wake Up and Say Goodbye (November 2008)
 Je repars from "The Mile End Sessions" (August 2010)
 Rice Paper from "Songs from the Last Day on Earth" (October 2012)
 Partir ailleurs  from "Songs from the Last Day on Earth"  (October 2012)

References

External links

 
 Reimagine.ai
 

1966 births
Alternative rock singers
Anglophone Quebec people
Canadian alternative rock musicians
Canadian humanists
Canadian people of Jewish descent
Canadian people of Thai descent
Canadian rock singers
Canadian male singer-songwriters
Canadian singer-songwriters
English emigrants to Canada
English people of Thai descent
English people of Jewish descent
Living people
MapleMusic Recordings artists
Singers from Montreal
People from Oxford
Simon Fraser University alumni
Juno Award for Pop Album of the Year winners